Anatoliy Mikhaylovich Golitsyn CBE (Russian: Анатолий Михайлович Голицын; August 25, 1926 – December 29, 2008) was a Soviet KGB defector and author of two books about the long-term deception strategy of the KGB leadership. He was born in Pyriatyn, USSR. He provided "a wide range of intelligence to the CIA on the operations of most of the 'Lines' (departments) at the Helsinki and other residencies, as well as KGB methods of recruiting and running agents." He became an American citizen by 1984.

Defection
Golitsyn worked in the strategic planning department of the KGB in the rank of Major. In 1961 under the name "Ivan Klimov" he was assigned to the Soviet embassy in Helsinki, Finland, as vice counsel and attaché. He defected with his wife and daughter to the Central Intelligence Agency (CIA) via Helsinki on December 15, 1961. They flew "with a CIA escort from Finland to Sweden and thence to the United States via Frankfurt am Main, Germany, arriving on 18 December 1961". He was interviewed by James Jesus Angleton, CIA counter-intelligence director. In January 1962, the KGB sent instructions to fifty-four Rezidentura throughout the world on the actions required to minimize the damage. All meetings with important agents were to be suspended.

In November 1962, KGB head Vladimir Semichastny approved a plan for assassination of Golitsyn and other "particularly dangerous traitors" including Igor Gouzenko, Nikolay Khokhlov, and Bogdan Stashinsky. The KGB made significant efforts to discredit Golitsyn by promoting disinformation that he was involved in illegal smuggling operations.

Golitsyn provided information about many famous Soviet agents including Kim Philby, Donald Maclean, Guy Burgess, John Vassall, double agent Aleksander Kopatzky who worked in Germany, and others. While unable to identify some agents like Philby specifically by name, Golitsyn provided sufficient information that SIS was able to determine the culprits. Thus, Golitsyn's defection in 1961 set in motion the process that definitively confirmed Philby as a Soviet mole.

Controversies
Golitsyn was a figure of significant controversy in the Western intelligence community. The military writer General Sir John Hackett and former CIA counter-intelligence director James Angleton identified Golitsyn as "the most valuable defector ever to reach the West". However, the official historian for MI5, Christopher Andrew, described him as an "unreliable conspiracy theorist". Andrew believes that although intelligence data provided by Golitsyn were reliable, some of his global political assessments of the Soviet and KGB strategy are questionable. In particular, he disputed the Golitsyn claim that the "Sino-Soviet split was a charade to deceive the West".

Accusing Harold Wilson

Golitsyn said that Harold Wilson (then prime minister of the United Kingdom) was a KGB informer and an agent of influence. This encouraged pre-existing conspiracy theories within the British security services concerning Wilson. During his time as president of the Board of Trade in the late 1940s, Wilson had been on trade missions to Russia and cultivated a friendship with Anastas Mikoyan and Vyacheslav Molotov. He continued these relationships when Labour went into Opposition, and according to material from the Mitrokhin Archive, his insights into British politics were passed to and highly rated by the KGB. An "agent development file" was opened in the hope of recruiting Harold Wilson, and the codename "OLDING" was given to him. However "the development did not come to fruition," according to the KGB file records.

Golitsyn also accused the KGB of poisoning Hugh Gaitskell, Wilson's predecessor as leader of the Labour Party, in order for Wilson to take over the party. Gaitskell died after a sudden attack of lupus erythematosus, an autoimmune disorder, in 1963. Golitsyn's claims about Wilson were believed in particular by the senior MI5 counterintelligence officer Peter Wright. Although Wilson was repeatedly investigated by MI5 and cleared of this accusation, individuals within the service continued to believe that he was an agent of the KGB, and this belief played a part in the coup plots against him.

Accusing Urho Kekkonen
Golitsyn said after his defection that the Note Crisis of 1961 was an operation masterminded by president Urho Kekkonen of Finland together with the Soviets to ensure Kekkonen's re-election. Golitsyn further said that Kekkonen had been a KGB agent codenamed "Timo" since 1947. Most Finnish historians believe that Kekkonen was closely connected with the KGB, but the matter remains controversial.

Golitsyn and Nosenko
In 1964, Yuri Nosenko, a KGB officer based in Geneva, Switzerland, insisted that he needed to defect to the United States, as his role as a double-agent had been discovered, prompting his recall to Moscow. Nosenko was allowed to defect, although his credibility was immediately in question because the CIA was unable to verify a KGB recall order. Nosenko made two extremely controversial claims: that Golitsyn was not a double agent but rather a KGB plant; and that he had information on the assassination of President John F. Kennedy by way of the KGB's history with Lee Harvey Oswald in the time Oswald lived in the Soviet Union.

Regarding the first claim, Golitsyn had said from the beginning that the KGB would try to plant defectors in an effort to discredit him. Regarding the second claim, Nosenko told his debriefers that he had been personally responsible for handling Oswald's case and that the KGB had judged Oswald unfit for their services due to mental instability and had not even attempted to debrief Oswald about his work on the U-2 spy planes during his service in the United States Marine Corps. Under great duress, Nosenko failed two highly questionable lie detector tests but passed a third test monitored by several Agency departments.

Judging the claim of not interrogating Oswald about the U-2 improbable, given Oswald's familiarity with the U-2 program, and faced with further challenges to Nosenko's credibility (he was thought to have falsely claimed to be a lieutenant colonel, a higher rank than it was thought he held), Angleton did not object when David Murphy, then head of the Soviet Russia Division, ordered him held in solitary confinement for approximately three-and-a-half years. This solitary confinement included 16 months in a tiny attic with no windows or furniture, heat or air conditioning. Human contact was completely banned. He was given a shower once a week and had no television, reading material, radio, exercise, or toothbrush. Interrogations were frequent and intensive. He spent an additional four months in a ten-foot by ten-foot concrete bunker in Camp Peary. He was told that this condition would continue for 25 years unless he confessed to being a Soviet spy.

James Angleton came to public attention in the United States when the Church Commission (formally known as the Senate Select Committee to Study Governmental Operations with Respect to Intelligence Activities), following up on the Warren Commission, probed the CIA for information about the Kennedy assassination. The Nosenko episode does not appear to have shaken Angleton's faith in Golitsyn, although  Richard Helms and J. Edgar Hoover thought otherwise. Hoover's objections are said to have been so vehement as to severely curtail counterintelligence cooperation between the FBI and CIA for the remainder of Hoover's service as the FBI's director. Nosenko was found to be a legitimate defector, a lieutenant colonel and became a consultant to the CIA.

Golitsyn's books

New Lies for Old
In 1984, Golitsyn published the book New Lies For Old, wherein he warned about a long-term deception strategy of seeming retreat from hard-line Communism designed to lull the West into a false sense of security, and finally economically cripple and diplomatically isolate the United States. Among other things, Golitsyn stated:
The "liberalization" would be spectacular and impressive.  Formal pronouncements might be made about a reduction in the communist party's role: its monopoly would be apparently curtailed.  An ostensible separation of powers between the legislative, the executive, and the judiciary might be introduced.  The Supreme Soviet would be given greater apparent power, and the president of the Soviet Union and the first secretary of the party might well be separated.  The KGB would be "reformed."  Dissidents at home would be amnestied; those in exile abroad would be allowed to return, and some would take up positions of leadership in government.

Sakharov might be included in some capacity in the government or allowed to teach abroad.  The creative arts and cultural and scientific organizations, such as the writers' unions and Academy of Sciences, would become apparently more independent, as would the trade unions.  Political clubs would be opened to nonmembers of the communist party.  Leading dissidents might form one or more alternative political parties.

There would be greater freedom for Soviet citizens to travel. Western and United Nations observers would be invited to the Soviet Union to witness the reforms in action.

Angleton and Golitsyn reportedly sought the assistance of William F. Buckley, Jr. (who once worked for the CIA) in writing New Lies for Old. Buckley refused but later went on to write a novel about Angleton, Spytime: The Undoing of James Jesus Angleton.

New Lies for Old received a first edition in Portuguese in 2018.

The Perestroika Deception
In 1995, Anatoliy Golitsyn  and Christopher Story published a book entitled The Perestroika Deception containing purported memoranda attributed to Golitsyn claiming:
"The [Soviet] strategists are concealing the secret coordination that exists and will continue between Moscow and the 'nationalist' leaders of [the] 'independent' republics."
"The power of the KGB remains as great as ever…  Talk of cosmetic changes in the KGB and its supervision is deliberately publicized to support the myth of 'democratization' of the Soviet political system."
"Scratch these new, instant Soviet 'democrats,' 'anti-Communists,' and 'nationalists' who have sprouted out of nowhere, and underneath will be found secret Party members or KGB agents."

Reactions
In his book Wedge: The Secret War between the FBI and CIA (Knopf, 1994), Mark Riebling stated that of 194 predictions made in New Lies For Old, 139 had been fulfilled by 1993, 9 seemed 'clearly wrong', and the other 46 were 'not soon falsifiable'.

According to Russian political scientist Yevgenia Albats, Golitsyn's book New Lies for Old claimed that "as early as 1959, the KGB was working up a perestroika-type plot to manipulate foreign public opinion on a global scale. The plan was in a way inspired by the teachings of the 6th-century BC. Chinese theoretician and military commander Sun Tsu, who said, "I will force the enemy to take our strength for weakness, and our weakness for strength, and thus will turn his strength into weakness."  Albats argued that the KGB was the major beneficiary of political changes in Russia, and perhaps indeed directed Gorbachev.  According to her, "one thing is certain: perestroika opened the way for the KGB to advance toward the very heart of power" in Russia. It has been said that Mikhail Gorbachev justified his new policies as a necessary step to "hug Europe to death", and to "evict the United States from Europe".

According to Soviet dissident Vladimir Bukovsky, "In 1992 I had unprecedented access to Politburo and Central Committee secret documents which have been classified, and still are even now, for 30 years. These documents show very clearly that the whole idea of turning the European common market into a federal state was agreed between the left-wing parties of Europe and Moscow as a joint project which Gorbachev in 1988–89 called our 'common European home'." (interview by The Brussels Journal, February 23, 2006).

On June 8, 1995, the British Conservative Member of Parliament Christopher Gill quoted The Perestroika Deception during a House of Commons debate, saying: "It stretches credulity to its absolute bounds to think that suddenly, overnight, all those who were Communists will suddenly adopt a new philosophy and belief, with the result that everything will be different. I use this opportunity to warn the House and the country that that is not the truth"; and: "Every time the House approves one of these collective agreements, not least treaties agreed by the collective of the European Union, it contributes to the furtherance of the Russian strategy."

According to Daniel Pipes, Golitsyn's publications "had some impact on rightist thinking in the United States".

Golitsyn's views are echoed by Czech dissident and politician Petr Cibulka, who has alleged that the 1989 Velvet Revolution in Czechoslovakia was staged by the communist StB secret police.

In popular culture

The 1996 American film Mission: Impossible featured a fictionalized character based on Anatoliy Golitsyn named Alexander Golitsyn, played by actor Marcel Iureș.

See also
 Finnish Security Intelligence Service
 List of Eastern Bloc defectors
 List of KGB defectors

References

Books
Anatoliy Golitsyn. New Lies for Old G. S. G. & Associates, Incorporated, 1990, 
Christopher Story (Editor). ("by Anatoliy Golitsyn") The Perestroika Deception : Memoranda to the Central Intelligence Agency, Edward Harle Ltd; 2nd Ed edition (1998)

External links
Interview with Christopher Story, editor of The Perestroika Deception; part I, part II, part III
Bombs Away, interview with Jeffrey Nyquist, 18 December 2004
Unmasking Spies, Then and Now, by Jeffrey Nyquist, Geopolitical Global Analysis, 01.06.2005
Memorandum to the CIA: 26 August 1991, by Anatoliy Golitsyn
IN HIS DEFECTOR HE TRUSTED : HOW THE CIA COUNTERINTELLIGENCE STAFF BROKE THE WESTERN INTELLIGENCE COMMUNITY FOR TEN YEARS (1962–1973)
The Perestroika Deception, by Anatoliy Golitsyn

1926 births
2008 deaths
Commanders of the Order of the British Empire
KGB officers
Russian writers
Soviet intelligence personnel who defected to the United States
People sentenced to death in absentia by the Soviet Union
American anti-communists